Cardinal Heenan may refer to: 

 John Heenan (cardinal), Bishop of Leeds, Archbishop of Liverpool
 Cardinal Heenan Catholic High School, Leeds
 Cardinal Heenan Catholic High School, Liverpool